Hanne Wieder (May 8, 1925 – May 11, 1990) was a German television and film actress.

Selected filmography
 Rosemary (1958)
 Heiße Ware (1959)
 Labyrinth (1959)
 Marili (1959)
 The Haunted Castle (1960)
  (1961)
  (1961)
 Snow White and the Seven Jugglers (1962)
 The House in Montevideo (1963)
  (1966, TV miniseries)
 Once a Greek (1966)
 Count Bobby, The Terror of The Wild West (1966)
  (1970)
 Rosemary's Daughter (1976)
  (1986)

External links

1925 births
1990 deaths
German film actresses
German television actresses
People from Hann. Münden
20th-century German actresses